The Three Sisters is a small mountain range found in the Mojave Desert, in Los Angeles County, California. They three main hills are the highly eroded remnants of what used to be the peaks of the northern San Gabriel Mountains, before recent sediment filled the area.

References 

Mountain ranges of the Mojave Desert
Mountain ranges of Los Angeles County, California